Wu Ming-ji or Wu Ming-chi is a Taiwanese politician. He was the Deputy Minister of the Council for Economic Planning and Development (CEPD) of the Executive Yuan in 2012–2013.

Early life
Wu earned his doctoral degree from the Graduate Institute of Technology and Innovation Management from National Chengchi University.

Political career
Prior to his appointment as the CEPD deputy ministry, Wu was the Director-General of the Department of Industrial Technology of the Ministry of Economic Affairs.

He is currently also the Director-General of Industrial Development Bureau of the Ministry of Economic Affairs.

See also
 Council for Economic Planning and Development

References

Government ministers of Taiwan
Living people
Year of birth missing (living people)